Democratic Center Party may refer to:

Democratic Center Party of Latvia
Democratic Center Party of Mexico
Democratic Center (Colombia)